Henryk Kowalski (17 July 1933 – 11 July 2021) was a Polish road cyclist.

Born in Turzysk in the Second Polish Republic Kowalski will have been forced to move westwards after World War II due to the changing of borders and expulsion of local populations, with his hometown being given to Ukraine. Kowalski started cycling professionally with Budowlani Warszawa between 1954–1955, spent a short spell with Stal Stocznia in 1956, before spending the majority of his career with KK Lechia Gdańsk between 1957–1970. It was while with Lechia he enjoyed his greatest success, winning the Tour de Pologne twice, in 1957 and 1961. and winning the Vuelta a Cuba in 1967. Kowalski died in Gdańsk aged 88, and is buried in the Żydowski cemetery in Chełm, Gdańsk.

Major results

1957
 1st Berlin–Cottbus–Berlin
 1st Overall  Tour de Pologne
1959
 1st Stage 1 Tour de Pologne
1961
 1st Overall  Tour de Pologne
1963
 2nd  GANEFO Games
1967
 1st Overall  Vuelta a Cuba

References

External links

1933 births
2021 deaths
Polish male cyclists
Place of birth missing
People from Wołyń Voivodeship (1921–1939)